Sidney H. Stein (born July 16, 1945) is a Senior United States district judge of the United States District Court for the Southern District of New York.

Education and career
Born in Passaic, New Jersey, Stein was a New York Army National Guard from 1969 to 1975. He received an Artium Baccalaureus degree from Princeton University in 1967 and attended the New York University Graduate School of Education before receiving a Juris Doctor from Yale Law School in 1972. While at Yale, Stein was an editor of the Yale Law Journal. He was a law clerk to Judge Stanley Fuld, Chief judge of the New York Court of Appeals from 1972 to 1973. He was in private practice in New York City from 1974 to 1995.

Federal judicial service
On January 11, 1995, Stein was nominated by President Bill Clinton to a seat on the United States District Court for the Southern District of New York vacated by Pierre N. Leval. Stein was confirmed by the United States Senate on March 17, 1995, and received his commission the same day.

In 2005, Judge Stein found that New York Attorney General Eliot Spitzer’s attempts to investigate national banks was subject to federal preemption by the Office of the Comptroller of the Currency.  He assumed senior status on September 1, 2010.

Other notable cases

Sitting with the 9th circuit, in 2 environmental rulings on February 4, 2022, Stein wrote regarding the Forest Service's commercial "thinning" of areas by cutting down trees. Stein would have ruled against the Forest Service's move to cut down trees in both cases, and his view was prevalent in one.

See also
List of Jewish American jurists

Sources

External links

1945 births
Living people
Princeton University alumni
Steinhardt School of Culture, Education, and Human Development alumni
Yale Law School alumni
Judges of the United States District Court for the Southern District of New York
United States district court judges appointed by Bill Clinton
People from Passaic, New Jersey
20th-century American judges
21st-century American judges